Homocysteine-responsive endoplasmic reticulum-resident ubiquitin-like domain member 1 protein is a protein that in humans is encoded by the HERPUD1 gene.

The accumulation of unfolded proteins in the endoplasmic reticulum (ER) triggers the ER stress response. This response includes the inhibition of translation to prevent further accumulation of unfolded proteins, the increased expression of proteins involved in polypeptide folding, known as the unfolded protein response (UPR), and the destruction of misfolded proteins by the ER-associated protein degradation (ERAD) system. This gene may play a role in both UPR and ERAD. Its expression is induced by UPR and it has an ER stress response element in its promoter region while the encoded protein has an N-terminal ubiquitin-like domain which may interact with the ERAD system. This protein has been shown to interact with presenilin proteins and to increase the level of amyloid-beta protein following its overexpression. Alternative splicing of this gene produces multiple transcript variants, some encoding different isoforms. The full-length nature of all transcript variants has not been determined.

Interactions 

HERPUD1 has been shown to interact with UBQLN1 and UBQLN2.

References

Further reading